The Daia is a right tributary of the river Secaș in Romania. It flows into the Secaș near the city Sebeș.

References

Rivers of Romania
Rivers of Alba County